The Carmelit ( Arabic: كرمليت) is an underground funicular railway in Haifa, Israel. Construction started in 1956 and ended in 1959. It is the oldest underground transit system in the Middle East and currently the only underground transit system in Israel (until the expected 2023 opening of Tel Aviv Light Rail). The Carmelit has closed down for repair on three occasions.

System
The Carmelit, named after Mount Carmel through which it runs, is an underground funicular railway in Haifa. Carmelit cars have a slanted design, with steps within each car and on the station platform. Since the grade varies along the route, the floor of each car is never quite level, and slopes slightly "uphill" or "downhill" depending on the location, the only exception being Masada station.

The four cars operate as two two-car trains, which run on single-track with a short passing loop to allow the trains to pass each other.

The technology used in the system forces it to have an even number of stations at approximately equal distances.  This means that some stations are not close to major centers, but were situated for technical reasons.

History

A rail-based solution to connect Mount Carmel with downtown Haifa was envisioned by the British mandatory authorities. However, practical talks only began in 1955 under the auspices of then-mayor Abba Hushi. The French company Compagnie Dunkerquoise d'Entreprises created a detailed plan and proposed a generous loan for a large part of the project, and an agreement was signed in 1956.  The plan was for a funicular system, and the inauguration took place in 1959, attended by Israeli prime minister David Ben Gurion and the French transport minister Robert Buron among others.

The Israeli company Solel Boneh carried out the works, which proceeded at a pace of three meters a day, other than a geologically difficult section where a speed of 1.5 meters a day was achieved.

Shutdowns
The Carmelit was shut down for intensive renovation on December 19, 1986, after 27 consecutive years. The old rolling stock was taken to a scrapyard near Kfar Masaryk in 1991, after being offered to the Israel Railway Museum which refused it due to high transport costs. After several delays and failed attempts, renovation work started on October 29, 1990. The Carmelit finally reopened to the public in early September 1992.

In March 2015, the Carmelit was closed again due to a faulty cable, and subsequently reopened in July 2015. At the same time new ticket machines were installed to accommodate the Rav-Kav ticketing system.

On Saturday, February 4, 2017, a fire erupted in the Paris Square station after working hours. One of the two trainsets was heavily damaged, as well as parts of the tunnel. As a result, the line was once more shut down and underwent an upgrade that included replacing both trainsets with new ones (supplied by Doppelmayr's Swiss subsidiary which built the original trainsets), a new control center, and a major refurbishing of the systems and infrastructure. It reopened in October 2018.

The Carmelit today
The small number of stations means that the Carmelit serves only a small part of Haifa – which was the important population and business center when it was designed. Nowadays, the vast majority of the city's population does not live near any of the stations, making it used by few only. There have been talks of extending the tunnels to reach more people, but this has not been done, primarily for economic reasons.  The most widely used public transportation system in the Haifa area consists of Egged buses, which serve most of the city.

Haifa's comptroller wrote in his 2004 report (published in 2005) about the declining use of the Carmelit. According to the report, the system is used by only 2,000 passengers a day, and has been losing money ever since its reopening in 1992. The accrued losses between 1992 and 2003 are over ₪191 million.

Since October 31, 2010, taking a bicycle on the Carmelit has been allowed at no additional cost.

An extensive BRT system called Metronit began operating in Haifa in late 2013. It was hoped the stops at some of the Carmelit stations would increase ridership on the line.

When the Carmelit reopened at the end of 2018, it experienced a surge in ridership, with 4,000 people taking it per day, the highest figure in 20 years.

, the Carmelit is the only subway in Israel. However, major construction on Tel Aviv's light rail, much of which will be underground, commenced in 2011.

Stations

Properties 
The Carmelit stations are small; entrance halls are at only the two terminal stations.

Stations in descending order

Operating hours

Gallery

See also
 List of funicular railways
 List of rapid transit systems
 Cable cars in Haifa
 Jerusalem Light Rail
 Tel Aviv Light Rail

References

External links

 
Carmelit on Urbanrail.net
 Pictures of Carmelit stations and cars

Underground funiculars
Underground rapid transit in Israel
Transport in Haifa
6 ft 6 in gauge railways
Funicular railways in Israel
Railway lines opened in 1959